Posht Rud or Posht-e Rud may refer to:
 Posht Rud, Bam, Kerman Province
 Posht-e Rud, Bardsir, Kerman Province
 Posht Rud, Sistan and Baluchestan
 Posht Rud Rural District, in Kerman Province

See also
 Rud Posht (disambiguation)